Lovering is a surname. Notable people with the surname include:
 
David Lovering (b.born 1961), American musician and magician
George Mason Lovering (1832–1919), American soldier and Medal of Honor recipient
Henry B. Lovering (1841–1911), American politician from Massachusetts
Jane Lovering (b. ? ), British author
John Francis Lovering (born 1930), Australian geologist and professor at University of Melbourne
Joseph Lovering (1813–1892), American scientist and educator
Otho Lovering (1892–1968), also credited as Otho Lovering, American film editor
Paul Lovering (born 1975), Scottish professional footballer (soccer player)
Tyler Lovering (born 1971), Canadian-Australian ice hockey player and commissioner
William C. Lovering (1835–1910), American politician from Massachusetts

See also
Lake Lovering, a lake in Quebec, Canada
, the name of more than one United States Navy ship
Lovering Colony State Hospital, a former state hospital in Taunton, Massachusetts, in the United States